The Hadith of Pen and Paper is an incident in which the Islamic prophet Muhammad expressed a wish to issue a written statement shortly before his death, possibly on a Thursday, but was prevented from doing so. Muhammad's intentions are debated though it is commonly believed that the statement would have formally designated his successor. Possibly because of its ramifications throughout the history of Islam, some have referred to this incident as the Calamity of Thursday.

Narration

Muhammad's request 
Muhammad became ill in 11 AH (632 CE) and his condition worsened reportedly on a Thursday, when he asked for writing materials so that he would "write something, after which you will not be led into error," as related on the authority of Ibn Abbas in the canonical Sunni collection Sahih al-Bukhari.

Umar's objection 
The account in Sahih al-Bukhari continues that Muhammad's companion Umar protested, "The illness has overwhelmed the prophet. We have the book of God [Quran] and that is enough for us." In another report by the Sunni Ibn Sa'd, Umar instead told those present that Muhammad was raving, as noted also by Madelung. That Muhammad was told he was delirious also appears in another report by Ibn Sa'd, transmitted similarly by the Sunni al-Tabari, though this second report is silent about who made that comment. The Sunni Ibn Kathir removes Umar from his report altogether, possibly fearing its negative image of Umar.

Quarrel 
The Sahih's report continues that a quarrel then broke out at Muhammad's bedside, with some suggesting that his orders should be followed and some siding with Umar to disregard the prophet's request, adds Ibn Sa'd in his most detailed report. As the noise and quarrel increased, Muhammad asked them to leave and did not write anything. In one of Ibn Sa'd's reports, Muhammad's wives demand that his request is fulfilled but are silenced by Umar. Another report of him identifies Muhammad's wife Zaynab as the one making this demand. Ibn Abbas is quoted in the Sahih as saying, "The greatest of all calamities is what intervened between the Apostle and his writing." Some reports instead attribute similar words to Ubayd Allah ibn Abd Allah. The phrase '' is sometimes used in reference to this event.

Muhammad's reaction 
Al-Bukhari and Ibn Sa'd both mention that Muhammad was saddened by the quarrel, while the Sunni al-Diyarbakri suppresses this matter in his report but retains Umar's name. In one of Ibn Sa'd's reports, Muhammad reprimanded, "They [the women] are better than you are," after Umar silenced Muhammad's wives who were asking the men to fulfill the prophet's wish.

Muhammad's recommendations 
Some reports add that Muhammad left three oral instructions in place of a written statement, though they have been recorded differently by various authors. One report by Ibn Sa'd lists two of these instructions as driving out the polytheists from Arabia and accepting delegations in the same manner as Muhammad had done. The third recommendation is absent, possibly forgotten by his source. The Shia Tabarsi reports that the third (missing) instruction was about Muhammad's family, the Ahl al-Bayt. In his account, Muhammad was later asked if he still wished to write something and he replied:Yet another report by Ibn Sa'd on the authority of Muhammad's cousin and son-in-law Ali lists the three instructions as prayer,  (Islamic alms), and (kindness to)  (slaves).

Debates
There is no dearth of speculation among scholars about what Muhammad intended to write. Shia scholars suggest that it would have been a formal appointment of Ali as the new leader, while Sunni authorities have advanced various alternatives.

Disobedience 
Noting that it was Umar who prevented Muhammad from writing his will, the SunniI Ibn Hazm suggests that he only meant good. He also claims that others present agreed with Umar and that the prophet's will must have had no religious significance. Otherwise, he says, Muhammad would have insisted on writing it. The Sunni al-Halabi similarly suggests that Umar only wanted to ease the prophet's task.

Designation of Abu Bakr 
Beginning with al-Baladhuri, many Sunni authors have presented the first caliph Abu Bakr as the designated successor, which Muhammad intended to put into writing on his deathbed. In one of al-Baladhuri's reports, Muhammad clearly says so, adding that his writing would prevent discord among Muslims. There is also no mention of Umar and Ali in al-Baladhuri's reports and the focus is on Abu Bakr and his daughter Aisha. 

The accounts of al-Halabi and Ibn Hazm are similar to that of al-Baladhuri. Al-Halabi relates from Aisha with no further chain of transmission, while Ibn Hazm also expresses his regret about this missed opportunity to designate Abu Bakr, which would have prevented so much bloodshed after Muhammad, in his view. 

Ibn Kathir goes further and presents a highly polemic account of Muhammad's death, adding that he designated Abu Bakr as his successor in his last sermon, an important announcement for which he had to purify himself first. The general Sunni belief today is that Muhammad did not appoint a successor. Al-Tabari only quotes two short reports about the pen and paper incident.

Designation of Ali 
In Shia sources, the incident is viewed as a calamity and a missed opportunity to designate Ali as the successor. For instance, the report of al-Mufid emphasizes Umar's disobedience and that it displeased Muhammad, who verbally reiterated Ali's rights on his deathbed. His account matches the Sunni narrative, according to Miskinzoda, except for the part about Ali. 

Madelung quotes an exchange between Ibn Abbas and Umar in which the latter claimed that Muhammad intended to name Ali as his successor and that he prevented this out of the conviction that Arabs would revolt against Ali. A tradition to this effect is also cited by the Shia Tababatai. This view has been echoed by Hazleton.

Community politics 
In Sunni Islam, this hadith has also been linked to the rise of the community politics that followed Muhammad's death. By not leaving a will, it is argued, Muhammad had implicitly accepted how the Muslim community would function after his death. This hadith has thus been linked to the emergence of the Sunni tradition, "My  will never agree on an error," an idea perpetuated by the Sunni theologians Ibn Hazm and Ibn Sayyid al-Nas, among others. Madelung alternatively argues that the Quran advises the faithful to settle some matters by consultation, but the succession of prophets is not one of them. That matter is settled by divine selection for the past prophets in the Quran, he writes.

Muhammad's authority 
For Miskinzoda, the focal point of the story is the question of Muhammad's religious authority, exemplified by Umar's statement, "You have the Quran, the book of God is sufficient for us." In her view, these traditions imply that the Quran is sufficient for the guidance of Muslims after Muhammad. In contrast, Hazleton notes that the Quran has been supplemented by the prophetic practice (Sunna). Shia Muslims add to these the practice of their Imams, citing the widely-reported Hadith al-Thaqalayn, in which Muhammad asks Muslims to seek guidance after him from the Quran and his family, the Ahl al-Bayt.

See also
 Succession to Muhammad
 Saqifa
 Hadith of Twelve Successors

References

Citations

Sources

External links
Thursday's calamity
The Companions of the Prophet as seen by the Shi’a and the Sunnis

7th-century Islam
Hadith
Life of Muhammad